Magnus Samuelsson (born December 21, 1969), is a Swedish actor, former strongman and winner of the 1998 World's Strongest Man contest in Morocco. He has also made it to the World's Strongest Man podium 5 times and the finals 10 times and is regarded as one of the best strongmen in history. The son of a former Swedish arm wrestling champion, he has also been ranked among the best arm wrestlers in the world and was a European Arm Wrestling champion prior to becoming a professional strongman.

Career
Samuelsson held the record for reaching the World's Strongest Man finals 10 times, a feat which he achieved over a 13-year span from 1995–2007. He has also achieved a podium place in WSM on five separate occasions.

In 2001, Samuelsson became the overall champion of the Strongman Super Series. After competing in the IFSA Strongman World Championship in 2005, he returned to compete in the 2006 World's Strongest Man but failed to make it past the qualifying rounds due to a back injury. A year later, Samuelsson reached the 2007 finals, eventually finishing in 5th place. However, after failing to make the finals in the 2008 World's Strongest Man contest, Samuelsson announced his retirement from competition after 14 years competing in the sport. He achieved a 31 podium finish making him one of the all-time most successful strongman competitors. Samuelsson also remains one of only five men to have successfully closed the No. 4 Captains of Crush hand-gripper under official conditions and the only man in history to rep it twice. 

Torbjörn Samuelsson (Samuelsson' brother) also competed in strongman competitions between 1996–2002, winning Sweden's Strongest Man twice and competing at the World's Strongest Man 2000–2002.

In 1995, Samuelsson accidentally broke the arm of Australian wrestler Nathan Jones during heats of the World's Strongest Man contest in Nassau, Bahamas. The injury occurred because Jones employed the novice technique of side twisting. The action combined with Samuelsson's own body strength resulted in a snapped humerus.

Media
Magnus Samuelsson was offered a role in the film Gladiator, but declined. One of the reasons he declined was that he believed the film was going to be a B movie. The agent who had phoned him to offer the role had told him that he would "fight with swords and so", and also named a couple of actors in the cast, which Magnus Samuelsson did not recognize.

In 2009 Samuelsson won the Swedish version of the television series Dancing with the Stars, beating songwriter Laila Bagge in the final.

Samuelsson plays Gunnar Nyberg, a detective in the 2011 Swedish crime thriller series Arne Dahl. It has also been aired in Germany and UK. The series are now available on Amazon Prime.

Samuelsson plays Clapa in the BBC's The Last Kingdom. A hulking Danish warrior, Clapa becomes one of the main protagonist Uhtred's best fighters, but his savagery in battle belies a warm heart and loyalty to his comrades that holds no bounds.

Personal life
Samuelsson lives in Tidersrum in Östergötland. He and his brother, Torbjörn, are both full-time farmers. Throughout his career, he has been supported at every competition by his wife Kristin, a former two-time winner of Sweden's strongest woman. They have one son, David, and one daughter, Sara.

Samuelsson is also an automobile racing enthusiast. In 2010 he competed in Rally Sweden, part of the World Rally Championship, finishing in 35th position out of 55.

Personal records

Done in the gym (according to Samuelsson himself)

Squat: 280 kg (617 lbs) for 10 reps raw
Bench press: 300 kg (661 lbs) for 1 rep raw
Deadlift: 385 kg (826 lbs)
 Barbell curl: 140 kg (308.5 lbs) for 4 reps

Contest history
1996  World Muscle Power - 2nd
1997  Glasgow Open - 1st
1998  Helsinki Strongman - 4th
1998  World Strongest Team Contest - 3rd
1998  Faroe GP - 1st
1998  World Strongman Challenge - 1st
1999  Faroe GP - 3rd
1999  Beauty and the Beast - 1st
1999  Iceland Viking of the North - 2nd
1999  World Strongest Team - 2nd
1999  Helsinki GP - 4th
1999  Czech GP - 1st
2000  Faroe GP - 3rd
2000  Ireland GP - 1st
2000  Europe Strongman Classic - 2nd
2000  Helsinki GP - 2nd
2000  Poland GP - 1st
2000  China GP - 1st
2000  Romanian GP - 1st
2001  Beauty and the Beast - 1st
2001  World Muscle Power - 2nd
2001  Europe's Strongest Man - 3rd
2001  Santo Domingo - 2nd
2001  Prague GP - 3rd
2001  Dutch GP - 2nd
2001  Stockholm GP - 1st
2001  Strongman Super Series - 1st
2003  World Muscle Power Canada - 3rd
2003  World Record Breakers Poland - 3rd
2004  World Strongman Stars Ukraine - 2nd
2004  Superseries GP Gothenburg - 1st
2007  Viking Power Super Series Norway - 3rd
2008  Sweden Super Series Sweden - 1st

References

 http://www.bbc.co.uk/programmes/profiles/2NGbyg7vtBbQxw4ZfGp4stk/clapa

1969 births
Swedish arm wrestlers
Living people
Swedish strength athletes
Reality show winners
Swedish rally drivers
Swedish farmers